Jack Avon is an analyst and writer based in the United Kingdom. He is the author of The Handbook of Financial Modeling and The Basics of Financial Modeling, published in New York in 2013 and 2014 respectively, and of The Bid Proposal Handbook, published by in London in May 2017. He has also authored The Interim Contractor, published in London in 2017, The Financial Modellers VBA Compendium, published in London 2018 and Becoming a Photographer, Book one, published in London 2019. In December 2020 he completed the follow-up to the Handbook of Financial Modeling called  Handbook of Financial Modeling Second Edition Avon is a world expert in financial modelling and the founder of XLDB Solutions url=http://www.xldbsolutions.com.

Early life and education
Jack Avon was born in Lusaka, the capital city of Zambia, in March 1967, where he lived until he moved with his family to the United Kingdom in June 1976. In March 1977 he moved to Hong Kong with his family due to his father's work, spending a year in Hong Kong and attended Quarry Bay School and Peak School. In September 1978 he returned to the United Kingdom to attend Clayesmore Preparatory School in Iwerne Minster, Dorset and then Clayesmore School. He completed his higher education at Bournemouth University and Royal Holloway, University of London.

In sport, Avon played rugby, field hockey and cricket and competed in athletics at Clayesmore School. He has played senior rugby at various clubs, including Bournemouth RFC, Purley RFC, Saracen FC, HKFC, Dorset & Wilts, and HKRFU. In hockey Avon has played for Dorset and Wilts, West of England, Poole HC, Valley Hockey, Hong Kong, Surbiton HC and Wimbledon HC.

Current and Future Publications

References

Living people
1967 births
People from Lusaka
British non-fiction writers
British financial analysts
English male field hockey players
Wimbledon Hockey Club players
Surbiton Hockey Club players
Alumni of Bournemouth University
Alumni of Royal Holloway, University of London
People educated at Clayesmore School